Microtermes macronotus is a small species of termite of the family Termitidae. It is native to India and Sri Lanka.

References

Termites
Insects of Sri Lanka
Insects described in 1913